"Silver Sail" is a single by punk rock band Wipers from the album of the same name. Released only on 7" gray vinyl, the single version of "Silver Sail" differed from the album version.

1993 singles
Wipers songs
1993 songs